Prince Euneon (Korean: 은언군, Hanja: 恩彦君) (29 May 1754 – 30 June 1801), personal name Yi In (Korean: 이인, Hanja: 李䄄), was a royal prince of the Joseon Dynasty. He was the grandfather of the 25th King of Joseon, King Cheoljong. After the death of Crown Prince Sado, he was exiled to Ganghwa Island. He was later executed in the 1801 Catholic Purge, due to having a Roman Catholic wife.

Family 
 Father:  King Jangjo of Joseon (13 February 1735 – 12 July 1762) (조선 장조)
Grandfather: King Yeongjo of Joseon (조선 영조) (31 October 1694 – 22 April 1776)
Grandmother: Royal Noble Consort Yeong of the Jeonui Yi clan (영빈 이씨) (15 August 1696 – 23 August 1764)
 Mother: Royal Noble Consort Suk of the Buan Im clan (? - 1773) (숙빈 임씨)
Grandfather: Im Ji-beon (임지번)
Grandmother:  Lady Kim of the Gimhae Kim clan (김해 김씨)
 Brother: Yi Jin, Prince Eunsin (11 January 1755 – 29 March 1771) (이진 은신군)
 Consorts and their respective issue(s)
 Royal Princess Consort Sangsan, of the Jincheon Song Clan (상산군부인 진천군송씨) (15 October 1753 – 4 April 1801), catholic name Mary
 Yi Dam, Prince Sanggye (상계군 이담) (21 January 1768 – 20 November 1786)
 Prince Yi Changsun (이창순)
 Prince Yi Changdeok (이창덕)
 Yi Dang, Prince Punggye (풍계군 이당) (1 February 1783 –8 May 1826)
 Princess Yi of the Jeonju Yi clan (성주 이씨) (4 August 1796 – 4 April 1872)
 Unknown concubine
 Prince Yi Seong–deuk (이성득), (1775 –27 November 1817)
 Prince Yi Cheol–deuk (이철득) (b.1780)
 Royal Princess Consort Jeonsan, of the Jeonju Yi clan (전산군부인 전주이씨), daughter of Yi Deok‐hui (이덕희)
 Unknown son
 Yi Gwang, Grand Internal Prince Jeongye (전계대원군 이광) (21 March 1785 – 2 November 1841)

References 

1754 births
1801 deaths
Joseon dynasty